The teachings of Swami Dayanand reached Guyana in the early 1900s but it was the arrival of missionary Bhai Parmānand in 1910 that led to the growth of Arya Samaj throughout the Colony. The Ārya Samāj doctrine rejects the idea of caste and the exclusive role of brahmins as religious leaders. The movement preaches monotheism and opposition to the use of images in worship as well as many traditional Hindu rituals.

Establishment 
In 1921 the first Ārya Samāj was formed and the movement continued to gain impetus as more people started to appreciate the Vedic teachings. The arrival of a second Vedic missionary, Pandit Mehtā Jaimīnī in 1929 led to centralised control and organisation of the Ārya Samāj. Other missionaries arrived in 1935, and in 1936 Pandit Bhaskarānand arrived and remained in Guyana for ten years organising the various Samājs. The American Aryan League, the parent body for all the Ārya Samājs in the country, was established in 1937 and registered under the friendly societies ordinance in 1938. A building to house the headquarters of the League was also established. Pandit Usharbudh Arya arrived in 1955 and one of his greatest contributions was the establishment of the Ārya Vīr Dāl, an organization meant for the youth.  Pandit Usharbudh Arya was so active in his social work across Guyana that his Ashram was established at the Mahaicony River. The then Burnham Government viewed the Vid Dal movement and Pandit Arya as paramilitary efforts to bolster the East Indians in Guyana. Pandit Arya was asked to leave Guyana by the Government.

Consolidation 
In 1975 the Ārya Samāj in Guyana had 40,000 members, with 35 Ārya Samāj branches affiliated to the American Aryan League. In 1968 the American Aryan League also assumed the name Guyana Arya Pratinidhi Sabha. In 1969 this organisation had received official recognition of the government of the new independent state of Guyana led by Forbes Burnham. Regular prayer meetings were held at the various meeting halls. There was a council of priests, Arya Pracharak Mandal, which ensured that the activities of the Samaj were conducted in accordance with the scriptures. In 1973, the Ārya Vīr Dāl was revived. Now it received the name Guyana Aryan Youth League as well. It coöperated with the parent body in the achievement of its objectives and played a major part in organising weekly services. The American Aryan League also ran a primary and a post-primary school.

Political problems and Division 
In the course of 1970's the then People's National Congress (PNC) led by Forbes Burnham increasingly became a feared dictatorial power that was seen as anti-East Indian.

A majority of East Indians in Guyana and those of the Arya Samaj movement sided with the People's Progressive Party (PPP) led by Cheddi Jagan. However, a few persons preferred not to. This was viewed as subversive by the Arya Samajists in Berbice especially when Burnham was embraced by a few leaders of the then American Aryan League.

The Berbice Central Arya Samaj (BCA) was formed in an effort to bring together all the Arya Samaj groups in Berbice and was seen as embracing Pandit Usharbudh Arya. The leaders of the BCA, spearheaded by Pandit Budhram Mahadeo CCH, included Lawyer Powaroo (Bengal Village), Pt Durga (Skeldon), Mahashay Raghubeer (64 Village), Gajadhar Singh (New Amsterdam), Dwarka Nauth (Crabwood Creek), Mahashay Kirpaul (Black Bush Polder), Pandita Singh (78 Village), Pt Manohar (71 Village), Mataji Sugrim (78 Village) and many others. Pandit Arya launched and led the first Vir Dal camp at No 71 Village in Berbice.

The split of the Arya Samaj in Guyana followed political lines. The advent of forced National Service in Guyana brought the split to a head when a few Arya Samaj leaders backed the National Service in exchange for position and a scholarship. The Guyana National Service was vehemently opposed by the traditional leaders who refused to let the daughters of Guyana go to the unknown dangers of the National Service centres in the forested regions of the interior of Guyana. Pandits Budhram Mahadeo CCH, and Pandit Ramlall (who later migrated to the USA) spearheaded the Arya Samaj's national condemnation of the National Service. At that time in Guyana's history, East Indian women opted to refrain from University education instead of having to undertake the National Service.

In the late 1970s the Berbice Central Arya Samaj called a unification meeting of the Arya Pratinidhi Sabha and the American Aryan League. This led to the formation of the Guyana Central Arya Samaj that has, since formation chosen to remain independent of political association.

Today the Guyana Central Arya Samaj (GCAS) is the umbrella organisation of all Ārya Samājīs in Guyana and is led by the children of those who were the leaders of the 1970s. In 2018, the executives of the GCAS include General President Dr Yog Mahadeo, General Secretary Aruna Lall, Treasurer Chaman Poonai, VP Seukumar Harikishun and other executives that include Amy Seedan, Renuka Mahadeo, Rupanie Bissoondial and Anil Naraine.

The Regional Branches continue their activities with the various mandirs across the country. The Berbice Central Arya Samaj continues to excel under the leadership of Dr Vishwa Mahadeo, Matajis Mando, Brahash and Shanta. The East Demerara Arya Samaj is headed by Pandit Seukumar Harikishun, Pandit Chaman Lall Poonai and Mataji Shakuntala. The West Demerara Arya Samaj flourishes under the leadership of Pandita Dhanrajie Haimraj and others. Dr Satish Prakash also contributes to Arya Samaj in Guyana with his annual camps and sermons.

It took over the headquarters of the Guyana Arya Pratinidhi Sabha and it has 29 affiliated Ārya Samāj branches and ten associated Ārya Samāj branches all over Guyana.

External links 
 Website of the Guyana Central Arya Samaj,

See also 
 List of Hindu temples outside India
 List of large Hindu temples
 Arya Samaj Pandit Ji
 Lists of Hindu temples by country
Arya Samaj Marriage Helpline

References 

Arya Samaj
Hinduism in Guyana
Overseas Indian organisations
Indian diaspora